Dachang Town is a station on Line 7 of the Shanghai Metro located in Baoshan District, Shanghai, People's Republic of China. It opened in 2009.

References

Railway stations in Shanghai
Line 7, Shanghai Metro
Shanghai Metro stations in Baoshan District
Railway stations in China opened in 2009